Thierry Martens (29 January 1942 – 27 June 2011) was a Belgian author who wrote science fiction, detective novels, short stories, and comics under the pen name Yves Varende. Between 1968 and 1977, he was editor of the Franco-Belgian comics magazine Spirou. He published several highly documented anthologies and studies about popular "Holmesian-style" French-language crime novels of the early twentieth century. He also authored some dark Holmesian pastiches in French as well as super-science novels.

Works

Sci-fi novels
 Les Gadgets de l'Apocalypse (1978)
 Les Tueurs de l'Ordre (1980)
 Tuez les Tous (1980)

Non-fiction studies
  Introduction to the Belgian re-edition (in French language) of the Lord Lister German novels - Claude Lefrancq Editeur Brussels 1995 (Vol.I) 1996 (Vol.II)

Holmesian novels
 Le Requin de la Tamise Lefrancq coll. En Poche, Paris 1997
 le Tueur dans le Fog
 Le Secret de l'Ile au Chien
 Les Meurtres du Titanic Lefrancq coll. En Poche, Paris 1998
 L'otage de Fraulein Doktor
 Sherlock Holmes et les Fantômes anthology (Fleuve noir 1999)

Anthologies
  Sherlock Holmes revient : an anthology of six German anonymous short stories (translated in French) originally published between 1907 and 1911. Introduction authored by editor/translator. (1996, éditions Fleuve Noir, collection Super Poche n° 27)

See also
A. J. Raffles vs. the contemporary German Lord Lister

Notes

External links 
 Sherlock Holmes revient
 L'Echo du Canon the French Sherlock Holmes society quarterly
 The European Wold Newton Universe - detectives characters section

Belgian writers in French
Belgian science fiction writers
Sherlock Holmes
1942 births
2011 deaths